is a Japanese surname and location name.

Akaike may also refer to:

Akaike information criterion statistical formula

People
Hirotsugu Akaike, a Japanese statistician
Masaaki Akaike, a Japanese politician
Akaike Nagatō, a medieval Japanese warlord

Places
Akaike, Fukuoka, former town
Akaike Station (Aichi)
Akaike Station (Fukuoka)
Akaike Station (Gifu)

Japanese-language surnames